Reginald de Dunstanville (c. 1110 – 1 July 1175) (alias Reginald FitzRoy, Reginald FitzHenry, Rainald, etc., French: Renaud de Donstanville or de Dénestanville) was an Anglo-Norman nobleman and an illegitimate son of King Henry I (1100–1135). He became Earl of Cornwall and High Sheriff of Devon.

Origins
Reginald was born in Dénestanville in the Duchy of Normandy, an illegitimate son of King Henry I (1100–1135) by his mistress Sybilla Corbet, who was a daughter and co-heiress of Sir Robert Corbet, lord of the manor of Alcester, Warwickshire, and wife (at some point) of "Herbert the King's Chamberlain".

Career
Antiquaries Carew and Williams refer to Reginald as the Earl of Bristol, and with Hals report that he married Agnes (sometimes called Avicia, or Beatrix), granddaughter of Condor of Cornwall (the Earl of Cornwall at the time of the Conquest), and in her right was made Earl of Cornwall. According to Carew William Camden gave an alternative account, with Henry I investing Reginald as earl of Cornwall, after taking it from William, Count of Mortain who rebelled against him in 1104; however, Camden's own account has Henry II advancing Reginald to the position, while making preparations to fight Stephen.

During the war between Matilda and Stephen, Reginald, who supported Matilda, was in control of Cornwall. Subsequently, forced out of Cornwall by Stephen's forces, Reginald lost the earldom to Alan of Richmond. By 1141, Stephen's forces had been beaten and Reginald was invested with the Earldom of Cornwall by his half-sister Matilda in 1141.  In about 1173 he granted a charter to his free burgesses of Truro in Cornwall and addressed his meetings at Truro to "All men both Cornish and English," suggesting a differentiation of nations. He served as Sheriff of Devon from 1173 to 1174.

Marriage and progeny
Reginald married Mabel FitzRichard, daughter of William FitzRichard, a substantial landholder in Cornwall, by whom he had the following progeny: 
Nicholas de Dunstanville (1136–1175);
Hawyse (or Denise) de Dunstanville (1138–21 April 1162), wife of Richard de Redvers, 2nd Earl of Devon;
Maud FitzRoy de Dunstanville of Cornwall (b. 1143, Dunstanville, Kent, England), wife of Sir Robert de Beaumont, Count of Meulan;
Ursula de Dunstanville (b. 1145), wife of Walter de Dunstanville, Lord Castlecomb;
Sarah de Dunstanville (b. 1147), wife of Ademar V, Viscount of Limoges;
Joan FitzRoy (b. c. 1150), wife of Ralph de Valletort, feudal baron of Trematon in Cornwall.

Illegitimate progeny
Reginald also had illegitimate children by his mistress Beatrice de Vaux (also known as de Valle), the daughter of Hubert I de Vaux and later the wife of William Brewer:
Henry FitzCount (d. 1222), Sheriff of Cornwall and Earl of Cornwall; and
William FitzCount.

Death and burial
Reginald died at Chertsey, Surrey, and was buried in Reading Abbey.

Notes and references

Notes

Explanatory

Citation

Sources

Cornwall, Reginald de Dunstanville, 1st Earl of
Cornwall, Reginald de Dunstanville, 1st Earl of
Cornwall, Reginald de Dunstanville, 1st Earl of
Earls of Cornwall
Cornwall, Reginald de Dunstanville, 1st Earl of
12th-century English people
High Sheriffs of Devon
Peers created by Empress Matilda
Sons of kings